Chandan Roy (born 20 December 1995) is an Indian actor. He made his major screen debut with Amazon Prime's Panchayat, created by The Viral Fever. Directed by Deepak Kumar Mishra, Roy plays the role of Vikas Shukla, sharing screen space with veterans actors Raghubir Yadav, Neena Gupta, and TVF fame Jitendra Kumar. He has since received critical appraisal from the audiences and critics alike.

Early life 
Roy hails from a village in Mahnar, Bihar. During his school days, he used to perform in his school plays and community functions, which germinated his interest in acting. Roy then moved to Patna for his higher studies to pursue Bachelors in Mass Communication from Patna University. In Patna, he got actively involved in the college theater circuit, performing street plays. For further studies, he joined the Indian Institute of Mass Communication and obtained his Diploma in Radio and Television.

Career 
After graduating from the Indian Institute of Mass Communication, he worked for Dainik Jagran as a journalist. But while Roy was in Delhi during his IIMC days, he was associated with Bahroop Theatre Group, Jawaharlal Nehru University, and National School of Drama Repertory.

After working with Jagran for two and a half years, Roy decided to quit his job and moved to Mumbai in 2017. He then subsequently performed a few roles. But in 2019, he made his breakthrough with his character in the web series Panchayat as Vikas Shukla gaining audiences and critics' appreciation

Filmography

Films

Web series

References

External links 

 
 

1995 births
Living people
Indian male film actors
Male actors in Hindi cinema
Male actors from Bihar
Indian male television actors
Indian male stage actors
21st-century Indian male actors